The Goddard Institute for Space Studies (GISS)  is a laboratory in the Earth Sciences Division of NASA's Goddard Space Flight Center affiliated with the Columbia University Earth Institute. The institute is located at Columbia University in New York City. It was named after Robert H. Goddard, American engineer, professor, physicist and inventor who is credited with creating and building the world's first liquid-fueled rocket.

Research at the GISS emphasizes a broad study of global change, the natural and anthropogenic changes in our environment that affect the habitability of our planet. These effects may occur on greatly differing time scales, from one-time forcings such as volcanic explosions, to seasonal/annual effects such as El Niño, and on up to the millennia of ice ages.

The institute's research combines analysis of comprehensive global datasets (derived from surface stations combined with satellite data for sea surface temperatures) with global models of atmospheric, land surface, and oceanic processes. Study of past climate change on Earth and of other planetary atmospheres provides an additional tool in assessing general understanding of the atmosphere and its evolution.

GISS was established in May 1961 by Robert Jastrow to do basic research in space sciences in support of Goddard programs. Formally the institute was the New York City office of the GSFC Theoretical Division but was known as the Goddard Space Flight Center Institute for Space Studies or in some publications as simply the Institute for Space Studies. But even before it opened, the institute had been referred to in the press as the Goddard Institute for Space Studies. It was separated from the Theoretical Division in July 1962. Its offices were originally located in The Interchurch Center, and the institute moved into Columbia's Armstrong Hall (a renovated apartment building previously known as the Ostend apartments and subsequently the Oxford Residence Hotel) in April 1966.

From 1981 to 2013, GISS was directed by James E. Hansen. In June 2014, Gavin A. Schmidt was named the institute's third director.

History of scientific research 

In the 1960s, GISS was a frequent center for high-level scientific workshops, including the "History of the Earth’s Crust Symposium" in November 1966 which has been described as the meeting that gave birth to the idea of plate tectonics.

At a GISS workshop in 1967, John Wheeler popularized the term "black hole" as a short-hand for 'gravitionally completely collapsed star', though the term was not coined there. Hong-Yee Chiu is credited with introducing the term "quasar" while working at GISS in 1964.

In September 1974, at a seminal meeting led by Patrick Thaddeus at GISS with John Mather (his then post-doc) and others discussions began on the possibility of building a satellite to measure both the spectrum and possible spatial fluctuations of the Cosmic Microwave Background. This led directly to the COBE satellite project and a Nobel Prize for Mather.

GISS personnel were involved as instrument and science team scientists in multiple historic NASA solar system missions, Mariner 5 to Venus, Pioneer 10 and 11 to Jupiter and Saturn, the Voyager program, Pioneer Venus, Galileo to Jupiter, the unsuccessful Mars Observer and Climate Orbiter, and Cassini-Huygens mission to Saturn.

Polarimetry has been a speciality of GISS since the Pioneer, Voyager, and Galileo missions, and has been adapted to Earth observing missions as well. Notably, the Glory mission in 2011 would have employed the Aerosol Polarimetry Sensor (APS) led by GISS scientists had it reached orbit,  and the upcoming PACE mission (launch date expected to be Nov 2023) will have two polarimeters on board.

Climate change research 
A key objective of Goddard Institute for Space Studies research is prediction of climate change in the 21st century. The research combines paleogeological record, analysis of comprehensive global datasets (derived mainly from spacecraft observations), with global models of atmospheric, land surface, and oceanic processes.

Climate science predictions are based substantially on historical analysis of Earth's paleoclimate (climate through geological ages), and the sea-level/ temperature/ carbon dioxide record.

Changes in carbon dioxide associated with continental drift, and the decrease in volcanism as India arrived at the Asian continent, allowed temperatures to drop & Antarctic ice-sheets to form. This resulted in a 75m drop in sea level, allowing our present-day coastlines & habitats to form and stabilize.

Global change studies at GISS are coordinated with research at other groups within the Earth Sciences Division, including the Laboratory for Atmospheres, Laboratory for Hydrospheric and Biospheric Sciences, and Earth Observing System science office.

Awards 
GISS director James Hansen received the Heinz Award in 2001.

In November 2004, climatologists Drew Shindell and Gavin Schmidt were named amongst Scientific American magazine's Top 50 Scientist award.

One-time GISS post-doctoral scientist John C. Mather was years later awarded the Nobel Prize in Physics in 2006.

Climate impacts researcher Cynthia Rosenzweig was awarded the World Food Prize in 2022.

Alumni 

People who have worked at GISS and their periods of employment include:
 W. David Arnett, postdoc
 Norman H. Baker (1962-1965)
 Alastair G. W. Cameron (1961-1966)
 Mark Cane (1966-1970, 1975–1976), programmer, postdoc
 Jérôme Chappellaz (1990-1991)
 Hong-Yee Chiu (1961-1984)
 Benjamin Cook (2008-)
 Thomas M. Dame (1983-1984), postdoc
 Anthony Del Genio (1979-2019)
 Dilhan Eryurt (née Ezer) (1964-1966, 1969–1973), postdoc and staff scientist
 Rhodes Fairbridge (1955-2006)
 Inez Fung (1986-1993)
 Michael Ghil (1975-1976)
 Douglas Gough (1967-1969)
 James Hansen (1967-2014)
 Christine P. Hendon (1998-2000), intern
 Robert Jastrow (1961-1981)
 John Knox (1995-2001), postdoc
 Joel S. Levine (1967-1969), grad student
 Kuo-Nan Liou (1970-1972), postdoc
 Leon B. Lucy (1962), postdoc
 Kate Marvel (2015-2022)
 John C. Mather (1974-1976), postdoc
 John McAfee (1968-1970), programmer
 Michael I. Mishchenko (1992-2020)
 Michael J. Prather (1985-1992)
 William J. Quirk, postdoc
 S. Ichtiaque Rasool (1961-1971)
 Cynthia Rosenzweig (1985-)
 William B. Rossow (1979-2007)
 Gavin Schmidt (1996-)
 Stephen Schneider (1971-1972), postdoc
 Stephen Self (1977-1979)
 Drew Shindell (1995-2014)
 Richard Somerville (1971-1974)
 Richard Stothers (1961-2011)
 Patrick Thaddeus (1966-1986)
 James W. Truran (1965-1967), postdoc
 Sachiko Tsuruta, graduate student

In popular culture 
 The institute is housed at the corner of West 112th St. and Broadway in New York City in Columbia University's Armstrong Hall. The building also houses Tom's Restaurant, which was the exterior for the restaurant in Seinfeld and the subject of the Suzanne Vega song Tom's Diner.
 WQED made a documentary in the 1960s "The Universe on a Scratch Pad" about the theoretical work being done at GISS.

See also
 Earth Simulator
 EdGCM
 National Center for Atmospheric Research
 Robert Jastrow
 James Hansen

References

External links
 Goddard Institute for Space Studies (GISS) - Official Site
 GISS Global Surface Temperature Analysis (GISTEMP) - Global Surface Temperature Data

1961 establishments in New York City
Goddard Space Flight Center
Education in Manhattan
Columbia University
Space technology research institutes
Aerospace research institutes
Aviation research institutes
Columbia University research institutes
Environmental research institutes
Broadway (Manhattan)